Mohammed Showqi Al-Islambouli (born January 21, 1957), a younger brother of Khalid Ahmed Islambouli, was one of the key members of the World Islamic Front for Jihad Against Jews and Crusaders and was based in Peshawar during the 1990s.

Militant life 
Islambouli organised the first teams of Egyptian mujahideen entering Afghanistan to battle the Soviet invasion, and by 1983 he had established a network smuggling people and weapons through Karachi, Pakistan and Egypt that still functioned towards the dawn of the War on Terror in 2001.

In late May 1995, Hassan al-Turabi met with Ayman al-Zawahiri to discuss the future of the Vanguards of Conquest; now to operate solely out of Egypt. al-Zawahiri and Mustafa Hamzah organised a meeting in Ferney-Voltaire on the French-Swiss border, attended by a colleague of Tal'at Fu'ad Qasim, an associate of Showky Al-Islambouli and the son of Said Ramadan. The group decided to focus their efforts on Addis Ababa, and that their veteran members would come together under the leadership of Islambouli.

Al-Islambouli came close to assassinating the Egyptian President Hosni Mubarak on 22 June 1995 on the way from Addis Ababa International Airport to an African summit in the city. Showky and his associates opened fire on the armor-plated limousine destroying most of the escort vehicles. However, Mubarak was saved by the skills of his chauffeur, who U-turned the damaged limousine and raced back to the airport where the presidential plane was waiting with running engines.

Over the winter of 1996–97, Al-Islambouli was commanding a team of al-Gama'a al-Islamiyya members, and allocated them to travel to Somalia to bolster the forces of the Islamic Liberation Party.

Al-Islambouli returned to Egypt in May 2011. He was arrested upon arrival at Cairo International Airport and was retried on terrorism charges. An Egyptian military court in Cairo ordered his release on health grounds in February 2012.

References

Egyptian Islamists
Living people
1957 births